Archips dispilanus is a species of moth of the family Tortricidae. It is found in Bhutan, India and Malaysia.

The larvae feed on Lonicera species, Nephelium lappaceum and Gardenia jasminoides.

References

Moths described in 1864
Archips
Moths of Asia